The Rivière du Sud-Ouest is a tributary of the southeast coast of the St. Lawrence River. This river flows in the administrative region of Bas-Saint-Laurent, in Quebec, in Canada, in the regional county municipalities of:
 Les Basques Regional County Municipality: municipality of Saint-Mathieu-de-Rioux;
 Rimouski-Neigette Regional County Municipality: city of Rimouski (sector Le Bic).

Geography 
The Southwest river rises in the outlet of Lake Saint-Mathieu, at Saint-Mathieu-de-Rioux. It then follows the St. Lawrence River in a northeast-southwest direction to flow into the Havre du Bic. During its course, it crosses Petit Lac Saint-Mathieu and Lac de la Station. Its two main tributaries are the outlet of Grand Lac Malobès and the Neigette River.

The last eight kilometers show more rugged terrain.

From the mouth of Lake Saint-Mathieu, the southwest river flows over  divided into the following segments:

Upper course of the river (segment of )
  towards the northeast, crossing under the bridge of the Ladrière road, to the southwest shore of Petit lac Saint-Mathieu;
  towards the north-east, crossing the full length of Petit lac Saint-Mathieu;
  towards the northeast, crossing the road to 5th rang, collecting the waters of the Neigette River (Les Basques), up to the route du 3th Rang Est;
  northwards, to the limit of Saint-Simon-de-Rimouski;
  towards the northeast, constituting the limit between Saint-Mathieu-de-Rioux and Saint-Simon-de-Rimouski;
  north-east, in Saint-Simon-de-Rimouski, to the road bridge of 2th rang Ouest;
  towards the northeast, forming the limit between Saint-Fabien and the town of Rimouski (sector Le Bic);

Upper course of the river (segment of )
  towards the northeast, in Rimouski, recovering the waters of the outlet of Lac des Coulombe (coming from the north), crossing Lac de la Station over its full length, to the dam located to the northeast;
  eastwards, to the bridge of 7th Avenue which crosses the village of Saint-Fabien;
  north-east, up to the confluence of the outlet of Grand Lac Malobès;
  north-east, passing under the Canadian National railway at the start of this segment, to the route 132 bridge;
  towards the north-east, crossing the Bay of Roses and passing under the bridge of Chemin du Petit Portage, to its confluence.

Hydrology 

Toponymy 
The toponym "south-west river" was formalized on December 5, 1968 at the Commission de toponymie du Québec.

Fauna 
The river hosts a small population of Atlantic salmon of around 40 spawners. The latter goes up the river on  where the fall of  constitutes an insurmountable obstacle. Salmon spend the first two years of their lives in the river. The second species in abundance is generally the American eel, which unlike salmon, goes up the river over its entire length to Lake Saint-Mathieu.

Notes and references

Appendices

Bibliography

Related articles 

 Saint-Mathieu-de-Rioux, a municipality
 Saint-Fabien, a municipality
 Rimouski, a city
 Neigette River, a stream
 Bic National Park
 Rimouski-Neigette Regional County Municipality
 Les Basques Regional County Municipality
 St. Lawrence River

External links 

Rivers of Bas-Saint-Laurent
Rimouski-Neigette Regional County Municipality